P. Vetrivel (1959 or 1960 – 15 October 2020) was a politician from Tamil Nadu, India.

Life
He was elected from the Perambur constituency to the Fifteenth Tamil Nadu Legislative Assembly as a member of the All India Anna Dravida Munnetra Kazhagam political party in the 2016 Tamil Nadu legislative assembly elections.

He was one of the 18 members who were disqualified by Speaker P. Dhanapal as they withdrew support for Chief Minister Edappadi K. Palaniswami and became loyal to rebel leader T.T.V. Dhinakaran and joined his party Amma Makkal Munnetra Kazhagam.

Electoral performance

References 

20th-century births
2020 deaths
Tamil Nadu MLAs 2016–2021
Place of death missing
Amma Makkal Munnetra Kazhagam politicians
All India Anna Dravida Munnetra Kazhagam politicians
Year of birth missing
Place of birth missing
Deaths from the COVID-19 pandemic in India
People from Chennai district